Sharlene Rädlein (born 10 August 1990 in Kingston) is a Jamaican model and beauty pageant titleholder who was crowned Miss Jamaica Universe 2015 and represented her country at the Miss Universe 2015 pageant.

Personal life
Sharlene is of Jamaican, German, and Scottish descent. She studied at Miami Dade College. She represented Eskay Caterers at Miss Universe Jamaica 2015.

Miss Jamaica Universe 2015
Sharlene was crowned Miss Jamaica Universe 2015 on 29 August 2015 at the Jamaica Pegasus Hotel, representing Eskay Cateres. As Miss Jamaica 2015, she competed at the Miss Universe 2015 pageant on 20 December 2015 in Las Vegas. She did not place.

References

External links
Miss Jamaica Official Website

Living people
Miss Universe 2015 contestants
Jamaican beauty pageant winners
People from Kingston, Jamaica
1990 births
Jamaican people of Scottish descent
Jamaican people of German descent